Aulacorthum is a genus of true bugs belonging to the family Aphididae.

The genus was first described by Mordvilko in 1914.

The genus has cosmopolitan distribution.

Species
These species belong to the genus Aulacorthum:

 Aulacorthum aegopodii Börner, 1939
 Aulacorthum albimagnoliae Lee, 2006
 Aulacorthum artemisiphaga Lee, Havelka & Lee, 2011
 Aulacorthum asteriphagum Lee, Kim & Lee, 2009
 Aulacorthum asteris Takahashi, 1965
 Aulacorthum cercidiphylli (Matsumura, 1918)
 Aulacorthum cirsicola (Takahashi, 1923)
 Aulacorthum cornaceae Ghosh, 1969
 Aulacorthum corydalicola Lee, Kim & Lee, 2009
 Aulacorthum cylactis Börner, 1942
 Aulacorthum dasi Ghosh, Basu & Raychaudhuri, 1970
 Aulacorthum dorsatum Richards, 1967
 Aulacorthum esakii (Takahashi, 1924)
 Aulacorthum euphorbophagum Zhang, Chen, Zhong & Li, 1999
 Aulacorthum flavum F.P.Muller, 1958
 Aulacorthum glechomae Takahashi, 1965
 Aulacorthum ibotum (Essig & Kuwana, 1918)
 Aulacorthum ixeridis Lee, Havelka & Lee, 2009
 Aulacorthum kerriae
 Aulacorthum knautiae Heie, 1960
 Aulacorthum kuwanai (Takahashi, 1933)
 Aulacorthum langei Börner, 1939
 Aulacorthum ligularicola Lee, 2002
 Aulacorthum linderae (Shinji, 1922)
 Aulacorthum majanthemi Müller, 1956
 Aulacorthum mediapallidum Su & Qiao, 2011
 Aulacorthum muradachi
 Aulacorthum myriopteroni (Zhang, 1980)
 Aulacorthum nepetifolii Miyazaki, 1968
 Aulacorthum palustre Hille Ris Lambers, 1947
 Aulacorthum perillae (Shinji, 1924)
 Aulacorthum phytolaccae Miyazaki, 1968
 Aulacorthum pterinigrum Richards, 1972
 Aulacorthum rhamni Ghosh, Ghosh & Raychaudhuri, 1971
 Aulacorthum rubifoliae (Shinji, 1922)
 Aulacorthum rufum Hille Ris Lambers, 1947
 Aulacorthum sclerodorsi (Kumar & Burkhardt, 1971)
 Aulacorthum sedens F.P.Muller, 1966
 Aulacorthum sensoriatum (David, Narayanan & Rajasingh, 1971)
 Aulacorthum smilacis Takahashi, 1965
 Aulacorthum solani (Kaltenbach, 1843) (foxglove aphid)
 Aulacorthum speyeri Börner, 1939
 Aulacorthum spinacaudatum (Kumar & Burkhardt, 1971)
 Aulacorthum syringae (Matsumura, 1918)
 Aulacorthum takahashii (Mason, 1925)
 Aulacorthum vaccinii Hille Ris Lambers, 1952
 Aulacorthum vandenboschi Hille Ris Lambers, 1967
 Aulacorthum watanabei (Miyazaki, 1971)

References

Aphididae